This is the list of the 100 best-selling singles of 2014 in France. Rankings are based on the combined sales of physical and digital singles.

Top 100 singles

See also
2014 in music
List of number-one hits of 2014 (France)
List of top 10 singles in 2014 (France)

References

Top 100 singles
France
Top 100 singles